The 2020 Forte Village Sardegna Open was an ATP tournament organised for male professional tennis players, held in Sardinia, Italy, in mid-October 2020 on outdoor clay courts. It was primarily organised due to the cancellation of many tournaments during the 2020 season, because of the ongoing COVID-19 pandemic. It was the first edition of the tournament, and it took place in Pula, Italy, from October 12 through 18, 2020.

Singles main draw entrants

Seeds

 Rankings are as of September 28, 2020.

Other entrants
The following players received wildcards into the singles main draw:
  Marco Cecchinato 
  Fabio Fognini
  Lorenzo Musetti 
  Giulio Zeppieri

The following players received entry from the qualifying draw:
  Federico Coria
  Jozef Kovalík
  Sumit Nagal
  Andrea Pellegrino

The following player received entry as a lucky loser:
  Andrej Martin
  Danilo Petrović

Withdrawals
Before the tournament
  Nikoloz Basilashvili → replaced by  Yannick Hanfmann
  Cristian Garín → replaced by  Gianluca Mager
  Philipp Kohlschreiber → replaced by  Roberto Carballés Baena
  Juan Ignacio Londero → replaced by  Andrej Martin
  Guido Pella → replaced by  Kamil Majchrzak
  Diego Schwartzman (schedule change) → replaced by  Danilo Petrović
  João Sousa → replaced by  Stefano Travaglia

Retirements
  Stefano Travaglia

Doubles main draw entrants

Seeds

 Rankings are as of September 20, 2020

Other entrants
The following pairs received wildcards into the doubles main draw:
  Marco Cecchinato /  Andreas Seppi 
  Andrey Golubev /  Aleksandr Nedovyesov

Withdrawals
During the tournament
  Pablo Andújar

Champions
All dates and times are CEST (UTC+2)

Singles

  Laslo Đere def.  Marco Cecchinato, 7–6(7–3), 7–5

Doubles

  Marcus Daniell /  Philipp Oswald def.  Juan Sebastián Cabal /  Robert Farah, 6–3, 6–4

References

External links
Official website

Forte Village Sardegna Open
Forte Village Sardegna Open
Forte Village Sardegna Open
Sardegna Open